Her Third is a 1972 East German (then GDR) film directed by Egon Günther and starring Jutta Hoffmann, Barbara Dittus, Rolf Ludwig and Armin Mueller-Stahl. The film is based on the short story Unter den Bäumen regnet es zweimal by Eberhard Panitz and tells the story of the single mother Margit looking for a new partner. The film was produced in 1971 by the DEFA film studio and premiered on 16 March, 1972 in East Berlin.

Plot
Margit Fließer (Jutta Hoffmann) is in her mid-thirties, has two children and has been divorced twice. She works as a mathematician in a medium-sized company where she is well respected by her colleagues. Margit has a shy and repressed personality due to her past and her childhood. Margit became a nurse in a Protestant order following the early death of her mother. Realizing that this vocation is not really for her she starts her studies at a university preparatory school. She falls in love with the lecturer Bachmann (Peter Köhncke), who becomes her first husband. The marriage fails, and she enters a second marriage with a blind man (Armin Mueller-Stahl). But her new husband is a disappointment and this second marriage also fails. She now decides to find "her third" husband herself and not leaving it up to fate. She chooses Hrdlitschka (Rolf Ludwig), a colleague, but only after some efforts and with the help of her friend Lucie (Barbara Dittus) she is successful and wins Hrdlitschka as her third husband.

Cast
 Jutta Hoffmann as Margit Flieser
 Barbara Dittus as Lucie
 Armin Mueller-Stahl as The Blind Man
 Rolf Ludwig as Hrdlitschka
 Peter Köhncke as Bachmann
 Erika Pelikowsky as Reverend Mother
 Christine Schorn as Young Woman
 Jaecki Schwarz as Young Man
 Klaus Manchen as Lucies's friend

Awards and honors
Her Third won two National Prizes in 1972, a third class national prize for Egon Günther for Achievements in Directing and a second class national prize for Jutta Hoffmann for Achievements in Acting. The film was screened at the Karlovy Vary International Film Festival in 1972 and at the Venice Film Festival in 1972, where Jutta Hoffmann won an award for Best Actor in the category Venezia Critici. Her Third was also chosen as East Germany's official submission to the 46th Academy Awards for Best Foreign Language Film, but did not manage to receive a nomination.

See also
 List of submissions to the 46th Academy Awards for Best Foreign Language Film
 List of German submissions for the Academy Award for Best Foreign Language Film

References

External links
 
 Her Third at filmportal.de/en
 Der Dritte  on the DEFA-Stiftung web site

1972 films
East German films
Films set in Berlin
Films based on short fiction
Films directed by Egon Günther
1970s German-language films